Georgi Petkov (born 30 July 1988) is a Bulgarian footballer who plays as a defender for Bulgarian Second League club OFC Pomorie, for whom he is captain.

References

External links

1988 births
Living people
Bulgarian footballers
OFC Sliven 2000 players
FC Pomorie players
Neftochimic Burgas players
First Professional Football League (Bulgaria) players
Segunda División B players
Association football defenders
Caravaca CF players
CF La Unión players